Roman Jebavý and Jan Šátral were the defending champions but chose not to defend their title.

Marin and Tomislav Draganja won the title after defeating Danilo Petrović and Ilija Vučić 6–4, 6–2 in the final.

Seeds

Draw

References
 Main Draw

Banja Luka Challenger - Doubles
2017 Doubles